The Cascada de Gujuli is a waterfall with a vertical drop of over  near the village of Gujuli, in the municipality of Urkabustaiz, Álava province, Spain. The waterfall is found along the Arroyo Oiardo in Gorbea Natural Park, about 30 km northwest of Vitoria-Gasteiz on the road between Orduña and Murgia.

The flow of the waterfall practically ceases during the summer.

Waterfalls of Spain
Geography of Álava
Landforms of the Basque Country (autonomous community)